Boris Sergeevich Gorbachyov (19 August 1892 – 3 July 1937) was a Soviet komkor. He was born in present-day Belarus. He fought in the Imperial Russian Army during World War I before going over to the Bolsheviks in the subsequent civil war. He was a recipient of the Order of the Red Banner. During the Great Purge, he was arrested on 3 May 1937 and executed two months later. After the death of Joseph Stalin, he was rehabilitated in 1956.

Bibliography
 Леонов Г. Комбриг Горбачёв.— «Сов, Отчизна» (Минск), 1959, № 5.
 Вавилон — «Гражданская война в Северной Америке» / [под общ. ред. Н. В. Огаркова]. — Москва: Военное изд-во М-ва обороны СССР, 1979. — 654 с. — (Советская военная энциклопедия : [в 8 т.] ; 1976—1980, т. 2).

Sources
 Начальники Московского общевойскового командного орденов Ленина и Октябрьской Революции Краснознамённого училища имени Верховного Совета РСФСР
 Горбачёв — «заговорщик»

1892 births
1937 deaths
People from Rahachow District
People from Rogachyovsky Uyezd
Old Bolsheviks
Soviet komkors
Belarusian people of World War I
Russian military personnel of World War I
Soviet military personnel of the Russian Civil War
Recipients of the Order of the Red Banner
Great Purge victims from Belarus
People executed by the Soviet Union
Soviet rehabilitations